Rosenovo may refer to the following places in Bulgaria:

 Rosenovo, Burgas Province
 Rosenovo, Dobrich Province